Tropical Air is an airline based in Zanzibar, Tanzania. It began operations in 1999 with a single aircraft and was the first locally owned airline in Zanzibar. It was founded by Captain Omar Haji . It operates in Pemba, Dar es Salaam alongside other area in Tanzania. They are no longer in operation

Destinations
Scheduled flights are operated to the following destinations:

Fleet

The Tropical Air fleet consists of the following aircraft (as of January 2013):

References

External links
Official Website

Airlines of Tanzania
Airlines established in 1999
1999 establishments in Tanzania